Graff is an unincorporated community in Moose Lake Township, Cass County, Minnesota, United States, near Pine River and Pequot Lakes. It is along Cass County Road 24, 64th Street SW, near 51st Avenue SW.

References

Unincorporated communities in Cass County, Minnesota
Unincorporated communities in Minnesota